Milan Zahálka (born 13 March 1977 in Ostrov Ohre, Czechoslovakia) is a professional football goalkeeper.

Career 
Between 1994 and 2001, Zahálka played football in Italy in the fourth and fifth divisions. Milan Zahálka joined Bohemians 1905 in February 2006, where he played 8 league matches in the Bohemian Football League. He spent the 2010/2011 season with Ethnikos Achna FC of the Cypriot First Division.

References

External links 
 Statistiche su Footballdatabase.eu

1977 births
Living people
Association football goalkeepers
Czech footballers
Expatriate footballers in Italy
S.S. Juve Stabia players
Bohemians 1905 players
FK Baník Sokolov players
U.S. Poggibonsi players
S.S.D. Città di Gela players
Ayia Napa FC players
Omonia Aradippou players
Ethnikos Achna FC players
Chalkanoras Idaliou players
Cypriot First Division players
Cypriot Second Division players
Expatriate footballers in Cyprus
Czech expatriate footballers
People from Ostrov (Karlovy Vary District)
Sportspeople from the Karlovy Vary Region